The Oak Street Garage is an historic automotive storage and repair facility at 2600 North Howard Street in Baltimore, Maryland.  The single story Beaux Arts style building was built in 1924 and expanded in 1927.  The building has a roughly trapezoidal shape, with a triangular office area in the front and two garage bays in the rear, the second (the 1927 addition) a few steps down from the first.  The building is finished in brick.  It was first used by Neely and Ensor, a manufacturer of high-end carriages that had branched out into the automotive field.

The building was listed on the National Register of Historic Places in 2013.

See also
National Register of Historic Places listings in East and Northeast Baltimore

References

Transportation buildings and structures in Baltimore
Industrial buildings and structures on the National Register of Historic Places in Baltimore
Industrial buildings completed in 1924
Remington, Baltimore
1924 establishments in Maryland